Teste de Elenco is a 2011 Brazilian comedy film, directed by Ian SBF and starring Fábio Porchat, Tatá Werneck and Letícia Lima.

The film was the first Brazilian feature film released exclusively on the internet for free.

Plot 
A theater director (Fabio Porchat) conducts test of cast with girls who share the same dream: to be an actress. However they are psychotic and will do anything to get the role.

References

External links
 
 

Brazilian comedy films
Internet films